Arnside is a railway station on the Furness Line, which runs between  and . It is owned by Network Rail and managed by Northern Trains.

The historic structure underwent major repairs and refurbishment, including the complete replacement of the rail deck in 2011. Similar work was carried out on the nearby Leven Estuary viaduct in the spring of 2006.

History
Opened on 1 August 1858 by the Ulverstone and Lancaster Railway (a company backed by, and later taken over by the Furness Railway) (FR), the station became part of the London, Midland and Scottish Railway during the Grouping of 1923. The station then passed on to the London Midland Region of British Railways on nationalisation in 1948.

When Sectorisation was introduced in the 1980s, the station was served by Regional Railways until the privatisation of British Rail.

In July 1922, this FR service ran five times per day in each direction on weekdays. The branch was also used by mineral trains from County Durham to the Barrow-in-Furness area, allowing them to avoid having to reverse direction at the busy junction at Carnforth. Local freight traffic continued as far as Sandside until final closure of the line in 1972. The disused platform face and trackbed is still visible behind the southbound platform.

Facilities
Whilst one building remains at the station, it is not in railway use.  Shelters are provided for passengers on both platforms, but the only link between them is via a footbridge with stairs (no step-free access).  Digital information screens, customer help points, timetable posters and automated announcements provide train running details.  As the station is unstaffed, tickets can only be bought from the ticket machine or on the train.

Services

There is one train per hour in each direction on weekdays, although the varying nature of the stopping patterns of each service means the timetable is irregular. On Sundays there is a train every hour each way (up from a two-hourly frequency since May 2018).

References

Sources

 
 
 Station on navigable Ordnance Survey map

External links

 
 

Railway stations in Cumbria
DfT Category F2 stations
Former Ulverston and Lancaster Railway stations
Railway stations in Great Britain opened in 1858
Northern franchise railway stations
Arnside